Sesquiterpene cyclase may refer to:
 Delta-cadinene synthase, an enzyme 
 Aristolochene synthase, an enzyme
 Trichodiene synthase, an enzyme